Vogeti or Ogeti is a Hindu surname used by a particular aristocratic family mainly based in Rajahmundry, Andhra Pradesh, India. It is one of the Merakaveedhi Telaga Martial race.

History 
This family belongs to the Telaga or Balija caste previously serving in the armies of Vijayanagara Empire. later reached Rajahmundry occupying merakaveedhi of Rajahmundry. Holding high positions in the Madras Army. They also held huge acreages around Korukonda, Gummaldoddi, Punyakshetram, Rajahmundry, Jambupatnam etc villages and cities. Later Guardians of courts of Dharmavaram and Kalavalapalli Zamindari estates. They also held the positions of Honoray Magistrate, Municipal Councillors of Rajahmundry and also been the Shavukars(Money Lenders). They started first bus service in Rajahmundry to Gokavaram via, Korukonda with the name Godavari Bus Service in the mid 1920s.

Hierarchy of a notable family with the surname 
The hierarchy of the family who held the part thereof Nandiagama estate residing in Rajahmundry was given by Historian Yatagiri Sri Rama Narasimha Rao. 
Vogeti Apparao Naidu, Zamindari Landholder, Wealthy Landlord,  Banker, Trader.
Vogeti Jaggarao Naidu, Zamindari Landholder, Wealthy Landlord,  Banker, Trader.
Raja Vogeti Ramakrishnayya, Zamindari Landholder, Honorary Magistrate, Municipal Councillor, Wealthy Landlord,  Banker, Trader, trustee of venugopala swamy devasthanam etc. 
Vogeti Seshagiri Rao, Zamindari Landholder part thereof Nandigama Estate.
Vogeti Venkata Gopala Ramakrishnam Raju, Zamindari Landholder part thereof Nandigama Estate.
Vogeti Lakshmana Raju, Zamindari Landholder part thereof Nandigama Estate.

Contributions 
The members of the family built a temple for Botlamma in Gannavaram village, and donated land for the temple.

References 

Indian surnames
Surnames
Telugu-language surnames
Social groups of Andhra Pradesh
Culture of Andhra Pradesh